Supply & Demand Chain Executive is a business technology magazine for supply chain executives at manufacturing and non-manufacturing companies and organizations, as well as public sector agencies, covering solutions and services for improving supply chain operations and efficiencies. The magazine is issued in print four times per year and in e-book form seven times per year. The magazine was founded in 2000 as iSource Business; the name change to Supply & Demand Chain Executive was implemented in 2003. The magazine is a part of AC Business Media. The headquarters is in Fort Atkinson, Wisconsin.

Overview 
The magazine has an audited circulation of approximately 54,868 supply chain professionals including C-level executives, vice presidents and executive decision makers. Articles are written by staff members, including Editor Ronnie Garrett and leading supply chain industry thought leaders.

Interactive Opportunities

SDCExec.com is the supply and demand chain industry's online source for updated industry news, exclusive solutions-based editorial and informative research and learning tools. Industry professionals and subscribers of the print and digital editions can benefit from sole video coverage including newscast series and onsite tradeshow coverage; Web seminars that provide live Q&A discussion pertaining to relevant industry topics; and customized surveys and industry polls to drive strategic planning and decision-making processes.

Buyer's Guide
The Supply & Demand Chain Executive Buyer's Guide is an interactive listing of supply chain service and solution providers, enabling all supply chain categories and industry types.

Awards
 The Supply & Demand Chain Executive Pros to Know honors supply chain management's best and brightest, with 2012 marking the award program's 12th annual listing. Pros to Know recognizes exceptional supply chain executives at manufacturing and non-manufacturing enterprises who lead initiatives to help prepare their companies' supply chains for times ahead.
 The Supply & Demand Chain Executive 100 spotlights successful and innovative transformation projects that deliver bottom-line value to small, medium and large enterprises across the range of supply chain function's that this industry's professionals face today. The supply chain projects featured in this awards program can serve as a roadmap for new opportunities to drive operation improvements.
 The Green Supply Chain Awards recognize small, mid-size and large enterprises that have leveraged technology to drive sustainable improvements in their supply chains. The program highlights a variety of sustainable approaches, strategies and solutions that companies are employing, and spotlights concrete results that many of these leaders are witnessing due to their sustainable efforts.

References

2000 establishments in Wisconsin
Bimonthly magazines published in the United States
Business magazines published in the United States
Magazines established in 2000
Magazines published in Wisconsin
Professional and trade magazines